Clifton South is a tram stop and Park & Ride site on the Nottingham Express Transit (NET) network. It is situated in the Borough of Rushcliffe, just to the south-west of the large City of Nottingham suburb of Clifton, on the A453. The Park & Ride site has a capacity of over 1000 cars. There is also an interchange with local bus services.

The tram stop is the terminus of line 2 of the NET, to Phoenix Park via Clifton, Wilford and the centre of Nottingham. The stop comprises a pair of side platforms flanking the twin terminal tracks, with one of the platforms being long enough to accommodate, if necessary, two trams. Trams run at frequencies that vary between 4 and 8 trams per hour, depending on the day and time of day. A half-hourly express bus service, the Skylink Express, links the stop to East Midlands Airport.

The Clifton South stop opened on 25 August 2015, along with the rest of NET's phase two.

Gallery

References

External links

Nottingham Express Transit stops
Park and ride schemes in the United Kingdom
Clifton, Nottinghamshire